The Isaac Miller Farm, near Fairfield, Kentucky, was listed on the National Register of Historic Places in 1994.  The  listing included 10 contributing buildings, a contributing structure, and a contributing site.

It includes a frame, two-story, central-passage plan house and various agricultural outbuildings.  It has also been known as O.M. Rogers Farm.

References

National Register of Historic Places in Spencer County, Kentucky
Farms on the National Register of Historic Places in Kentucky
Central-passage houses